The University Greys (or Grays) were Company A of the 11th Mississippi Infantry Regiment in the Confederate Army during the American Civil War. Part of the Army of Northern Virginia, the Greys served in many of the most famous and bloody battles of the war.

Formation 
The rifle company joined the 11th Infantry at its inception on May 4, 1861, after Mississippi seceded from the Union. Their name "University Greys" derived from the gray color of the men's uniforms and from the fact that almost all of the Greys were students at the University of Mississippi. Nearly the entire student body (135 men) enlisted; only four students reported for classes in fall 1861, so few that the university closed temporarily.

Engagements 
The most famous engagement of the University Greys was at Pickett's Charge during the Battle of Gettysburg, when the Confederates made a desperate frontal assault on the Union entrenchments atop Cemetery Ridge.  The Greys penetrated further into the Union position than any other unit, but at the terrible cost of sustaining 100% casualties—every soldier was either killed or wounded.

After Gettysburg, the depleted Greys were merged with Company G (the "Lamar Rifles").  The unit continued to fight until the last days of the war.

In popular culture 
The story of the University Grays is memorialized in an opera composed by Dr. Arthur Kreutz who was Professor of Music at the University of Mississippi using text from the book of the same name by Zoe Lund Schiller. The opera was published by Ricordi of New York in 1961. A copy of the score resides in the library of the Northern Illinois University. The opera was given its first performance in 1961 at the University of Mississippi under the auspices of the Department of Music.

In Ventress Hall at the University of Mississippi, a stained glass window in Ventress Hall depicts a mustering of the University Greys.

See also
List of Mississippi Civil War Confederate units
11th Mississippi Infantry Monument

Sources

Further reading 

 11th Mississippi Infantry: A Brief History by Steven Davis – covers the history of the regiment
 11th Mississippi Infantry - Company A – roster of the Greys and other companies in the regiment, including status as killed, wounded, etc.
 History of the Ole Miss Engineering School – includes information about the Greys, though its figure for the total killed appears to disagree with the roster linked aboveUnits and formations of the Confederate States Army from Mississippi
1861 establishments in Mississippi
Military units and formations established in 1861